Iphiseius is a genus of mites in the Phytoseiidae family.

Species
 Iphiseius degenerans (Berlese, 1889)
 Iphiseius martigellus El-Badry, 1968

References

Phytoseiidae